This is a list of hospitals in the state of Louisiana.  See also List of medical schools in the United States.

Caddo Parish and Bossier Parishes
Brentwood Hospital - Shreveport, Louisiana
Christus Bossier Emergency Hospital - Bossier City, Louisiana
Christus Highland Medical Center - Shreveport, Louisiana
Ochsner LSU Health Shreveport - Academic Medical Center - Shreveport, Louisiana
Ochsner LSU Health Shreveport - St. Mary Medical Center (formerly Christus Schumpert Medical Center) - Shreveport, Louisiana
Overton Brooks VA Medical Center - Shreveport, Louisiana
Shriners Hospital - Shreveport, Louisiana
Willis-Knighton Bossier Health Center - Bossier City, Louisiana
Willis-Knighton Medical Center - Shreveport, Louisiana
Willis-Knighton Pierremont Health Center - Shreveport, Louisiana
Willis-Knighton South & the Center for Women’s Health - Shreveport, Louisiana

Calcasieu Parish
Christus St. Patrick Hospital - Lake Charles, Louisiana
Lake Charles Memorial Hospital - Lake Charles, Louisiana
Lake Charles Memorial Hospital for Women - Lake Charles, Louisiana
West Calcasieu Cameron Hospital - Sulphur, Louisiana
Women and Children's Hospital - Lake Charles, Louisiana

East Baton Rouge Parish
Baton Rouge General Medical Center – Bluebonnet Campus - Baton Rouge, Louisiana
Baton Rouge General Medical Center – Mid-City Campus - Baton Rouge, Louisiana
Lane Regional Medical Center - Zachary, Louisiana
Ochsner Medical Center - Baton Rouge - Baton Rouge, Louisiana
Our Lady of the Lake Regional Medical Center - Baton Rouge, Louisiana
Surgical Specialty Center - Baton Rouge, Louisiana
The NeuroMedical Center - Baton Rouge, Louisiana 
Vista Surgical Hospital - Baton Rouge, Louisiana
Woman's Hospital - Baton Rouge, Louisiana

Jefferson Parish
East Jefferson General Hospital - Metairie, Louisiana
Ochsner Medical Center - Jefferson, Louisiana
Ochsner Medical Center - Kenner (formerly Kenner Regional Medical Center) - Kenner, Louisiana
Ochsner Medical Center - West Bank (formerly Meadowcrest Hospital) - Gretna, Louisiana
Tulane–Lakeside Hospital - Metairie, Louisiana
West Jefferson Medical Center - Marrero, Louisiana

Lafayette Parish
HealthSouth Rehabilitation Hospital of Lafayette - Lafayette, Louisiana
Lafayette General Medical Center - Lafayette, Louisiana
Lafayette General Southwest - Lafayette, Louisiana
Our Lady of Lourdes Regional Medical Center - Lafayette, Louisiana
University Medical Center - Lafayette, Louisiana
Women's and Children's Hospital - Lafayette, Louisiana

Lafourche, St. Charles and Terrebonne Parishes
Leonard J. Chabert Medical Center - Houma, Louisiana
St. Charles Parish Hospital - Luling, Louisiana
Terrebonne General Medical Center - Houma, Louisiana
Thibodaux Regional Medical Center - Thibodaux, Louisiana
Our Lady of the Sea Hospital - Cut Off, Louisiana
Ochsner St Anne General Hospital - Raceland, Louisiana

LaSalle Parish
Hospital Service District#2 of LaSalle Parish or LaSalle General Hospital - Jena, Louisiana

Orleans Parish
Children's Hospital of New Orleans - New Orleans, Louisiana
New Orleans East Hospital - (Eastern New Orleans) New Orleans, Louisiana
Ochsner Baptist Medical Center (formerly Memorial Medical Center) - New Orleans, Louisiana
Touro Infirmary - New Orleans, Louisiana
Tulane University Medical Center - New Orleans, Louisiana
VA Medical Center of New Orleans - New Orleans, Louisiana
University Medical Center New Orleans - New Orleans, Louisiana

Ouachita and Morehouse Parishes
Bastrop Rehabilitation Hospital - Bastrop, Louisiana
Glenwood Regional Medical Center - West Monroe, Louisiana
Ochsner LSU Health Shreveport - Monroe Medical Center (formerly EA Conway Hospital) - Monroe, Louisiana
Morehouse General Hospital - Bastrop, Louisiana
P & S Surgery Center - Monroe, Louisiana
Saint Francis Medical Center - Monroe, Louisiana
Saint Francis Specialty Hospital - Monroe, Louisiana

Rapides Parish
Central Louisiana Surgical Hospital - Alexandria, Louisiana
Christus St. Francis Cabrini Hospital - Alexandria, Louisiana
Huey P. Long Medical Center - Pineville, Louisiana
Rapides Regional Medical Center - Alexandria, Louisiana

St. Tammany, Tangipahoa, and Washington Parishes
Cypress Pointe Surgical Hospital - Hammond, Louisiana
Hood Memorial Hospital - Amite, Louisiana
Lakeview Regional Medical Center - Covington, Louisiana
Lallie Kemp Regional Medical Center - Independence, Louisiana
Louisiana Heart Hospital - Lacombe, Louisiana
North Oaks Medical Center - Hammond, Louisiana
North Oaks Rehabilitation Hospital - Hammond, Louisiana
Northshore Psychiatric Hospital - Slidell, Louisiana
Ochsner Medical Center – Northshore - Slidell, Louisiana
Our Lady of Angels Hospital (OLAH) - Bogalusa, Louisiana
Riverside Medical Center - Franklinton, Louisiana
St. Tammany Parish Hospital - Covington, Louisiana
Slidell Memorial Hospital and Medical Center - Slidell, Louisiana
Sterling Surgical Hospital - Slidell, Louisiana

Other Louisiana Parishes
Abbeville General Hospital - Abbeville, Louisiana
Prairieville Family Hospital - Prairieville, Louisiana
Acadia-St. Landry Hospital - Church Point, Louisiana
Allen Parish Hospital - Kinder, Louisiana
Acadian Medical Center - Eunice, Louisiana
Assumption General Medical Center - Napoleonville, Louisiana
Avoyelles Hospital - Marksville, Louisiana
Bayne Jones Army Community Hospital - Fort Polk, Louisiana
Beauregard Memorial Hospital - De Ridder, Louisiana
Byrd Regional Hospital - Leesville, Louisiana
Iberia Medical Center - New Iberia, Louisiana
Iberia Medical Center - North Campus - New Iberia, Louisiana
Hardtner Medical Center - Olla, Louisiana
Oakdale Community Hospital - Oakdale, Louisiana
Ochsner Medical Complex – Iberville - Plaquemine, Louisiana
Opelousas General Hospital - Opelousas, Louisiana
Our Lady of the Lake Ascension (formerly St. Elizabeth Hospital) - Gonzales, Louisiana
Plaquemines Parish Medical Center - Port Sulphur, Louisiana
Pointe Coupee General Hospital - New Roads, Louisiana
South Cameron Memorial Hospital - Creole, Louisiana
St. Bernard Parish Hospital - Chalmette, Louisiana
St. James Parish Hospital - Lutcher, Louisiana
Savoy Medical Center - Mamou, Louisiana
Teche Regional Medical Center - Morgan City, Louisiana
Winn Parish Medical Center - Winnfield, Louisiana

References

Louisiana

Hospitals